Polish historic regions are regions that were related to a former Polish state, or are within present-day Poland, with or without being identified in its administrative divisions.

There are several historic and cultural regions in Poland that are called ethnographic regions. Their exact borders cannot be drawn, as the regions are not official political or administrative units. They are delimited by culture, such as country traditions, traditional lifestyle, songs, tales, etc. To some extent, the regions correspond to the zones of Polish language dialects. The correspondence, however, is by no means strict.

Regions of the current Polish state

The following historic regions within Poland's modern borders belonged to the Polish state during most of its existence, inhabited by a majority or a sizeable Polish- or Cashubian-speaking population, thus forming the core Polish territory:
Greater Poland, the nucleus of Polish statehood, during the Partitions of Poland renamed together with Kuyavia, Łęczyca-Sieradz Land and northern part of Mazovia as South Prussia, later made a part of the Napoleonic Duchy of Warsaw, after its dissolution partially in Congress Poland, later Vistula Land, a historical region of Russia, while the other part was in Hohenzollern-ruled Grand Duchy of Posen outside the German Confederation, later renamed Province of Posen, finally annexed upon the establishment of North German Confederation by Germany, thus forming a German historical region
Kalisz Land, during the Partitions of Poland renamed together with Kuyavia, Łęczyca-Sieradz Land and northern part of Mazovia as South Prussia, later made a part of the Napoleonic Duchy of Warsaw, after its dissolution partially in Congress Poland, later Vistula Land, a historical region of Russia, while the other part was in the Hohenzollern-ruled Grand Duchy of Posen outside the German Confederation, later renamed Province of Posen, finally annexed upon the establishment of North German Confederation by Germany, thus forming a German historical region
Pałuki, during the Partitions of Poland renamed together with rest of Greater Poland, Kuyavia, Łęczyca-Sieradz Land and northern part of Mazovia as South Prussia, later made a part of the Napoleonic Duchy of Warsaw,֪ after its dissolution a part of the Hohenzollern-ruled Grand Duchy of Posen outside the German Confederation, later renamed Province of Posen, finally annexed upon the establishment of North German Confederation by Germany, thus forming a German historical region
Krajna, during the Partitions of Poland renamed together with rest of Greater Poland, Kuyavia, Łęczyca-Sieradz Land and northern part of Mazovia as South Prussia, later made a part of the Napoleonic Duchy of Warsaw,֪ after its dissolution a part of the Hohenzollern-ruled Grand Duchy of Posen outside the German Confederation, later renamed Province of Posen, finally annexed upon the establishment of North German Confederation by Germany, thus forming a German historical region
Kuyavia, during the Partitions of Poland renamed together with rest of Greater Poland, Kuyavia, Łęczyca-Sieradz Land and northern part of Mazovia as South Prussia, later made a part of the Napoleonic Duchy of Warsaw, after its dissolution partially in Congress Poland, later Vistula Land, a historical region of Russia, while the other part was a part of the Hohenzollern-ruled Grand Duchy of Posen outside the German Confederation, later renamed Province of Posen, finally annexed upon the establishment of North German Confederation by Germany, thus forming a German historical region
Inowrocław Land
Brześć Land
Dobrzyń Land
Lesser Poland, centre of Polish statehood during late Middle Ages, during the Partitions of Poland renamed Western Galicia with Duchy of Oświęcim, Duchy of Zator and the Grand Duchy of Cracow, forming part of the Kingdom of Galicia and Lodomeria, a historical region of Austria 
Kraków Land
Siewierz Land (New Silesia)
Oświęcim Land
Zator Land
Dąbrowa Basin
Podhale
Spisz (only partially in modern Poland, also a Slovakian and a Hungarian historical region)
Orawa (only partially in modern Poland, also a Slovakian and a Hungarian historical region)
Sandomierz Land
Lublin Land
Masovia, during the Partitions of Poland the northern part renamed together with Greater Poland, Kuyavia, and Łęczyca-Sieradz Land as South Prussia, while the southern part was a part of Russia, the entire region later made a part of the Napoleonic Duchy of Warsaw, after its dissolution part of Congress Poland, later Vistula Land, a historical region of Russia
Kurpie
Płock Land
Rawa Land
Polesia (also a historical region of Belarus, Ukraine, Lithuania, and Russia, only minor part remains in modern Poland)
 Cherven Cities, also a historical region of Ukraine, only partially in modern Poland), also known as Red Ruthenia, also known as Halychyna, Halych Ruthenia or Halych Rus’, also a historical region of Ukraine and Hungary; during the Partitions of Poland partially in the Kingdom of Galicia and Lodomeria, a historical region of Austria and Hungary, while the northern part was in Congress Poland, later renamed Vistula Land, a historical region of Russia
Chełm Land, including the Zamość Region, during the Partitions of Poland partially in the Kingdom of Galicia and Lodomeria, a historical region of Austria, while the other part was in Congress Poland, later renamed Vistula Land, a historical region of Russia
Przemyśl Land,
Bełz Land, only partially in modern Poland, while the other part including its capital is in Ukraine, during the Partitions of Poland a part of the Kingdom of Galicia and Lodomeria, a historical region of Austria,
notably without the Lwów Land and its capital city of Lwów, currently entirely in Ukraine, before World War 2 a city with absolute Polish-majority population, and one of the principal administrative, economic, educational, scientific, cultural and religious hubs of Poland; earlier, the nucleus and principal center of Polish national movement struggling to regain the independence of the country after the Partitions
Pomerelia or Gdańsk Pomerania, later part of the historical Polish region of Royal Prussia, also a Danish and Swedish historical region; during Partitions of Poland made a part of West Prussia (outside the German Confederation, finally annexed upon the establishment of North German Confederation by Germany, thus being a German historical region)
Kashubia
Kociewie
Chelmno Land (
Łęczyca Land, Sieradz Land and Wieluń Land ( and ), during the Partitions of Poland renamed together with Kuyavia, Łęczyca-Sieradz Land and northern part of Mazovia as South Prussia, later made a part of the Napoleonic Duchy of Warsaw, after its dissolution part of Congress Poland, later Vistula Land, a historical region of Russia
Podlasie (only partially in modern Poland, also a Belarusian and Lithuanian historical region), during the Partitions of Poland part of Russia
Drohiczyn Land
Mielnik Land
Southern Podlasie
Suwałki Region (- the latter term may, however, also refer to the earlier Yotvingia, only part in modern Poland, also a Lithuanian historical region)

Another group of territories constituted (either directly or as a fief) a part of the Polish state for varying amounts of time, ranging from an episode in the Middle Ages (e.g. Kłodzko Land, Lubusz Land, Lusatia) to several hundreds of years in the case of Warmia. Among them, only Warmia, Powiśle, southern Masuria, as well as Upper, Cieszyn and Eastern Lower Silesia retained sizeable Polish-speaking populations into the beginning of 20th century.
Masuria, also known as Lower Prussia, part of the East Prussia (a German historical region)
 Galindia, 
 Sasna
 Bartia
 Natangia 
 Lithuania Minor (() or Prussian Lithuania, (only a small part is in Poland; also a historical Lithuanian land and a German historical region, its bulk is currently located in the Kaliningrad Oblast)
 Nadruvia
Warmia (also a German historical region, part of the historical Polish region of Royal Prussia, during Partitions of Poland a part of the East Prussia outside the German Confederation, finally annexed upon the establishment of North German Confederation by Germany, thus being a German historical region)
Powiśle (roughly ), with its northern part forming the Malbork Land otherwise known as the Vistula fens; two whole region otherwise referred to as Upper Prussia, part of the East Prussia (a German historical region) 
Pomesania 
Pogesania
Lubusz Land, only partially in modern Poland - during the high Middle Ages absorbed into the region of New March (also a Czech and German historical region)
Lusatia (only partially in modern Poland, also a Czech, Austrian, and German historical region)
Upper Lusatia (also a Czech, Austrian and German historical region)
Lower Lusatia (also a Czech, Austrian and German historical region)
Farther Pomerania (see Pomerania, also a German historical region)
Western Pomerania (see Pomerania, also a Swedish, Danish and German historical region, only partially in modern Poland)
Silesia, only part in Poland, also a Czech, Austrian and German historical region
Upper Silesia (also a Czech, Austrian, and German historical region)
Cieszyn Silesia (also a Czech, Austrian, and German historical region; only partially in modern Poland, the other part called  is in the Czech Republic)
Lower Silesia (also a Czech, Austrian and German historical region)
Kłodzko Land (also a Czech, Austrian and German historical region)

Historic regions of former Polish states, currently entirely outside current Polish borders
Outside Poland are several historic regions which were once part of the Polish–Lithuanian Commonwealth or the Second Polish Republic. While these regions are important for Polish history, calling them Polish is in some cases controversial, as most of them, with the exceptions of Vilnius Region in Dzūkija, as well as Grodno Region in Dzūkija or Black Ruthenia, were either never or centuries ago predominantly populated by ethnic Poles and now lie beyond the borders of Poland. They are:
Livonia, Latvia and Estonia, also a historical German, Swedish and Russian region 
Samogitia, Lithuania, during Partitions of Poland a part of Russia
Aukštaitija, Lithuania, during Partitions of Poland a part of Russia
Dzūkija, Lithuania and Belarus, partially overlapping with Black Ruthenia, during Partitions of Poland a part of Russia
Vilnius Region
Black Ruthenia, Belarus, during Partitions of Poland a part of Russia, also a historical regions of Lithuania, Turkey and Mongolia
Grodno Region
White Ruthenia, rest of Belarus as a whole), during Partitions of Poland a part of Russia, also a historical region of Lithuania, Turkey and Mongolia
Novgorod Land and Pskov Land, Russia, also historical regions of Lithuania, Turkey and Mongolia
Smolensk Land, Russia, also a historical region of Lithuania, Belarus, Turkey and Mongolia
Podolia, Ukraine, during the Partitions of Poland a part of Galicia, also a historical region of Hungary, Austria, Turkey and Mongolia
Volhynia, Ukraine, also known as Lodomeria, also a historical region of Hungary, Austria, Turkey and Mongolia
rest of Ukraine (excluding Polesia, Volhynia, Red Ruthenia, Podolia and Transcarpathian Rus) as a whole, also a historical region of Ukraine and Russia, also part the Crimean Khanate, a historical land of Mongolia and Turkey
Moldavia, currently in Romania, Moldova and Ukraine , also a historical region of Hungary, Russia, Turkey and Mongolia
Vallachia, currently in Romania, also a historical region of Hungary and Turkey
Moravia, currently the Czech Republic, also historical region of Germany, Austria and Hungary
Slovakia as a whole, also historical region of Germany, Austria and Hungary
colonies of the Duchy of Courland and Semigallia, at the time a Polish-Lithuanian fief, formerly Terra Mariana, a historical German region, later known as Livonia, currently in Latvia and Estonia
Gambia, also a historical region of Portugal, France, the United Kingdom and Senegal
Tobago Island, Trinidad and Tobago, also a historical region of Spain, Malta (Sovereign Military Order of Malta), the Netherlands, France and the United Kingdom
a settlement near modern Toco on Trinidad, Trinidad and Tobago., also a historical region of Spain, Malta (Sovereign Military Order of Malta), the Netherlands, France, and the United Kingdom

Bibliography
 Norman Davies, God's Playground: A History of Poland, vol. 1: The Origins to 1795; vol. 2: 1795 to the Present, Oxford, Oxford University Press, 1981, .  Chapter two: "The Polish Land", pp. 23–52.

See also
Administrative division of Poland
Historical regions of Central Europe
Prowincja
Territorial changes of Poland
Voivodeships of Poland

References